Gillian Laub (April 24, 1975) is an American photographer and filmmaker, based in New York.

Early life and education
Laub was born in 1975 and raised in Chappaqua, New York. She graduated from the University of Wisconsin-Madison with a degree in comparative literature before studying photography at the International Center of Photography in New York City.

Publications
Testimony. New York: Aperture, 2007. . With essays by Ariella Azoulay and Raef Zreik.
Southern Rites. New York: Damiani, 2015. .
Family Matters. New York: Aperture, 2021. Photographs and text by Laub. .

Exhibitions
Gillian Laub: Family Matters, International Center of Photography, New York, 2021

Films
Southern Rites

Collections
Harvard Art Museums, Cambridge, MA: 11 prints (as of 17 October 2021)

References

1975 births
Living people
20th-century American Jews
American women photographers
American filmmakers
21st-century American Jews
20th-century American women
21st-century American women